Anomodon attenuatus, commonly known as anomodon moss, is a species of moss in the family Thuidiaceae. It has a wide-ranging distribution and can be found from Canada to Central America and the Caribbean as well as in Europe and Asia (India, eastern Russia, and Turkey).

References

Bryaceae
Plants described in 1833